The Åland Coalition is a political alliance of the main political parties in Åland formed to contest the Åland seat in the Parliament of Finland. Its representative usually sits with the Swedish People's Party faction in Parliament.

History
The Coalition first contested national elections in 1948, when they won a single seat in the parliamentary elections. Since then the alliance has retained its seat in every election, polling between 0.2% and 0.4% of the national vote.

References

Political parties in Åland
Political party alliances in Finland